The Jigoku-zoshi ("Handscrolls of Buddhist Hell") is a late 12th-century Japanese scroll (emakimono, 絵巻物), depicting the 8 great hells and the 16 lesser hells in text and painting.

See also
List of National Treasures of Japan (paintings)

References

Japanese paintings
12th-century manuscripts
Mahayana texts
Naraka
Paintings in the collection of the Tokyo National Museum

fr:Rouleaux des enfers
ja:地獄草紙